Brannon Ray Jeffers is a Democratic member of the North Carolina House of Representatives who has represented the 2nd district (including all of Person County, as well as part of Durham County) since 2023. Jeffers previously served on the Person County Board of Commissioners from 2008 to 2020.

Committee assignments

2023-2024 session
Appropriations
Appropriations - Agriculture and Natural and Economic Resources
Agriculture
Local Government
State Government

Electoral history

2022

2020

2016

2014

2012

2008

References

Living people
Year of birth missing (living people)
People from Roxboro, North Carolina
North Carolina A&T State University alumni
21st-century American politicians
County commissioners in North Carolina
Democratic Party members of the North Carolina House of Representatives